Ana Buchukuri (born 4 April 1990) is a Georgian politician. Member of Parliament of Georgia since 2020.

Biography
 Office of the Prime Minister, Deputy Head 2020

 Governmental Administration, Human Rights Secretariat, Head 2020
 Ministry of Internal Affairs, Deputy Head of Administration 2018-2020

 Ministry of Internal Affairs, Legal Department, Deputy Director 2017-2018

 Ministry of Economy and Sustainable Development, Parliamentary Relations Department, Head 2017

 LEPL National Center for Educational Quality Enhancement, Legislative Department, Head 2015-2017

 “New Vision” University, Assistant to the Professor 2914-present

 Office of the Public Defender, Analytical Department, Head Specialist 2014-2015

 Ministry of Justice, advisor in administration 2012-2014

 Office of the Public Defender, Jurisdiction Department, Head Specialist 2011 - 2012

 LEPL National Center for Educational Quality Enhancement, accreditation expert 2011

 Office of the Public Defender, practitioner 2009-2010

References

External links
 Parliament of Georgia

1990 births
Living people
Members of the Parliament of Georgia
21st-century politicians from Georgia (country)